Moving Out is an album by jazz saxophonist Sonny Rollins. This was his second for Prestige Records, featuring Kenny Dorham, Elmo Hope, Percy Heath, and Art Blakey, and one track with Thelonious Monk, Tommy Potter, and Art Taylor. The first 4 tracks had originally appeared on as the 10-inch LP  Sonny Rollins Quintet Featuring Kenny Dorham (PrLP 186), and the final track had appeared on the 10-inch LP Sonny Rollins and Thelonious Monk (PrLP 190).

Reception
At Allmusic,  Michael G. Nastos called the group "one of the more potent combos of 1954." Author and musician Peter Niklas Wilson called the album "simply a typical blowing session, in which virtuoso up-tempo playing and a wealth of invention in a well-known framework count for more than structural innovation".

Track listing
All compositions by Sonny Rollins except as indicated

Side one

 "Moving Out" - 4:31
 "Swingin' for Bumsy" - 5:48
 "Silk 'n' Satin" - 4:03

Side two

 "Solid" - 6:27
 "More Than You Know" (Edward Eliscu, Billy Rose, Vincent Youmans) - 10:48

Recorded on August 18, 1954 (first four tracks), and October 25 ("More Than You Know")

Personnel
Sonny Rollins – tenor saxophone
Kenny Dorham – trumpet - except More Than You Know
Elmo Hope  – piano
Percy Heath  – bass
Art Blakey  – drums
Thelonious Monk  – piano on "More Than You Know"
Tommy Potter  – bass on "More Than You Know"
Art Taylor  – drums on "More Than You Know"

References

1956 albums
Sonny Rollins albums
Albums produced by Bob Weinstock
Albums recorded at Van Gelder Studio
Prestige Records albums